The United States sent a delegation to compete at the 1984 Summer Paralympics in Stoke Mandeville, United Kingdom and New York City, United States of America.  Its athletes finished first in the gold and overall medal count.

The 15 members of the United States Paralympic team at the 1984 Summer Paralympics in Les Autres classes included four people with muscular dystrophy, two with multiple sclerosis, two with Friedreich's ataxia, one with arthrogryposis, three with osteogenesis imperfecta, and one with short stature.

At the 1984 Games, Great Britain won the most medals among all Les Autres events.  They claimed 55.  Spain was second with 38 and the United States was third with 26.

Medalists

Gold medalists

Silver medalists

Bronze medalists

See also 
 United States at the Paralympics
 United States at the 1984 Summer Olympics

References

External links
International Paralympic Committee Official Website
United States Paralympic Committee Official Website

Nations at the 1984 Summer Paralympics
1984
Summer Paralympics